Pyrola minor, known by the common names snowline wintergreen, lesser wintergreen, and common wintergreen, is a plant species of the genus Pyrola. It has a Circumboreal distribution and can be found throughout the northern latitudes of Eurasia and North America.

References

External links

Jepson Manual Treatment
Washington Burke Museum
Photo gallery

minor
Flora of temperate Asia
Flora of Europe
Flora of Canada
Flora of the Northeastern United States
Flora of the Western United States
Flora of California
Flora of the Sierra Nevada (United States)
~
Flora of the Alps
Plants described in 1753
Taxa named by Carl Linnaeus
Flora without expected TNC conservation status